Pocomoke may refer to:

The Pocomoke people, a Native American tribe
Pocomoke City, Maryland, a town
Pocomoke River, a tributary of the Chesapeake Bay on the Eastern Shore of Maryland
Pocomoke Sound, a bay of the Chesapeake Bay
Pocomoke State Forest, Maryland
USS Pocomoke, the name of three United States Navy ships